Lake Toxaway may mean:

Lakes
Lake Toxaway, a reservoir in Transylvania County, North Carolina
Toxaway Lake (Idaho), a glacial lake in Custer County, Idaho

Communities
Lake Toxaway, North Carolina, an unincorporated community in Transylvania County, North Carolina